Minha Doce Namorada (English: My Sweet Girlfriend) is a Brazilian telenovela produced and broadcast by TV Globo. It premiered on 19 April 1971 and ended on 21 January 1972, with a total of 242 episodes. It's the ninth "novela das sete" to be aired at the timeslot. It is created by Vicente Sesso and directed by Régis Cardoso.

Cast

References

External links
 

1971 telenovelas
Brazilian telenovelas
TV Globo telenovelas
1971 Brazilian television series debuts
1972 Brazilian television series endings
Portuguese-language telenovelas